Overwatch is a force protection tactic in modern warfare where one small military unit, vehicle or aircraft supports another friendly unit while the latter is executing fire and movement tactics.  The term was coined in U.S. military doctrine in the 1950s.

An overwatching unit typically takes a vantage position (usually a high ground or tall structure with good defilade) where it can observe the terrain far ahead, especially likely enemy positions and movements.  This allows it to act as a warning system against hostile aggressions and provide effective covering fire for advancing friendly units.

See also
 Combined arms
 Bounding overwatch

References

Force protection tactics
Land warfare